See also Campbell Settlement, York County
 Campbell Settlement is a settlement in Kings County, New Brunswick between Nackawic between Route 595 and Route 105.

History

Notable people

See also
List of communities in New Brunswick

References

Settlements in New Brunswick
Communities in Kings County, New Brunswick